Antonín Svoboda (born 14 March 2002) is a Czech footballer who plays as a forward for Karviná.

Club career
He started his career with FC Zbrojovka Brno. On 22 August 2018 he joined the Red Bull Football Academy in Salzburg. He war also part of the UEFA Youth League team 2019–20. At the beginning of the 2020–21 season he was transferred to FC Liefering.

Svoboda made his debut for Austrian Second League side Liefering in September 2020 against FC Wacker Innsbruck. He came in 69th minute for Chukwubuike Adamu.

He made his debut for the senior team of FC Red Bull Salzburg on 25 February 2021 in a Europa League Round of 32 game against Villarreal, as an added time substitute.

Honours
FC Liefering

Runner-up
 Austrian Football First League: 2021

References

2002 births
Footballers from Brno
Living people
Czech footballers
Czech Republic youth international footballers
Association football forwards
FC Red Bull Salzburg players
FC Liefering players
MFK Karviná players
2. Liga (Austria) players
Czech First League players
Czech expatriate footballers
Expatriate footballers in Austria
Czech expatriate sportspeople in Austria